Eddie hittar guld is a 2001 Viveca Lärn children's book.

Plot
Eddie is eight years old and will soon begin the second grade at school, where he gets a new schoolteacher. However, he better enjoys the brook near the forest. Meanwhile, his father Lennart has become a non-drinking alcoholic.

References

2001 children's books
Bohuslän in fiction
Rabén & Sjögren books
Works by Viveca Lärn
2001 Swedish novels